Hugo Yasky (born 10 October 1949) is an Argentine teacher, union leader and politician. Since 2006 he has been Secretary-General of the Argentine Workers' Central Union (CTA), a major trade union federation in Argentina. Since 2017 he has additionally been a member of the Argentine Chamber of Deputies representing Buenos Aires Province.

Yasky is also vice president of New Encounter, a kirchnerist political party affiliated to the Frente de Todos.

Biography
Hugo Yasky was born in 1949 in Ramos Mejía, a city in the Greater Buenos Aires Metropolitan Area. His family is of Romanian-Jewish origin, although he was raised in a Jewish secular household. His grandfather was the first Socialist local councillor in Ramos Mejía.

He started working as a teacher in 1971, aged 21. He joined the teacher's union, and voted for the creation of the CTERA union in 1973. He was fired in 1978, during the National Reorganization Process. He started to work again in 1981, in Lomas de Zamora, recreating the local teacher's union. He was elected secretary general of SUTEBA in 1994.

He was elected secretary general of the CTA in 1997. Back then, he opposed the policies of president Carlos Menem, and took part in a hunger strike at the Carpa blanca. There were new elections in 2011, and he was initially defeated by Pablo Micheli, who opposed the president Cristina Fernández de Kirchner, supported by Yasky. The elections were contested, and the judiciary confirmed Yasky as president. Micheli considered that the presidency would have interfered in the elections via loyalist judges, and Yasky that the judiciary confirmed their suspicions about electoral fraud.

He was elected to the Argentine Chamber of Deputies in the 2017 legislative election.

Electoral history

References

External links 

mention on CTA website.

1949 births
Argentine Jews
Jewish Argentine politicians
Argentine people of Romanian-Jewish descent
Argentine trade union leaders
Living people
Members of the Argentine Chamber of Deputies elected in Buenos Aires Province
People from Ramos Mejía